Scillonian is a quarterly magazine of the Isles of Scilly, first published in 1925.

It has reported on  historical maritime events such as the wreck of the SS Delaware in 1871, the grounding of the SS Minnehaha in 1910, and the grounding of the passenger ferry Scillonian in 1951.

References

External links
 Scillonian Magazine Indexes at Scillypedia

News magazines published in the United Kingdom
Quarterly magazines published in the United Kingdom
Isles of Scilly
Magazines established in 1925